Pastor K. T. Thomas (18 June 1927 – 11 April 2011) was born in 1927 to Idichandy Thomas and Dinamma at Kallissery, Kerala, India.

Life
He was a Brethren believer and had a close relation with the Malayalam Christian poet K. V. Simon. In 1953, he was appointed as Central Secretariat in New Delhi, India. In 1956, under Pastor M.K.Chacko started his ministry at Karol Bagh, Delhi, India. In 1969, he formed the IPC Northern Region with other few church ministers. He died on 11 April 2011 after more than five decades of Christian ministry in northern India.

References

External links 
 Indian Pentecostal Church of God Northern Region Official Website
 Indian Pentecostal Church, Kolkata Prayer Centre

1927 births
2011 deaths
Christian clergy from Kerala
People from Alappuzha district